The Jokela rail accident occurred on 21 April 1996, at 07:08 local time (04:08 UTC) in Tuusula, Finland, approximately  north of Helsinki. Four people were killed and 75 were injured when express train P82 from Oulu, bound for Helsinki, derailed in heavy fog. The overnight sleeper train was carrying 139 passengers and five crew members. The official investigation into the accident revealed that it was caused by overspeeding through a slow-speed turnout.

It is estimated that the total cost of the accident was over FIM 26 million (€4.3 million).

Causes 
Railway maintenance work was going on near Jokela railway station, and the usual southbound track was out of service. Because of heavy fog and high speed, the driver was unable to see the distant signal that warned about a divergent routing with a turnout speed limit of  ahead. The visibility was a few dozen metres. Before the accident, drivers of passing trains had reported that the visibility of signals was very low. Moreover, the printed notice about the track diversion, the so-called weekly warning, was confusingly written.

Upon noticing the signal, the driver made an emergency brake application but could only decrease the speed to  before the train entered the turnout. During the journey, the driver had slightly oversped a number of times to maintain the schedule.

Aftermath 
The Accident Investigation Board produced 18 recommendations, which included improvements over railway signalling, better seat fixing, improvements on communication and accelerated building of the automatic train control system. However, the Jyväskylä rail accident happened only two years later, showing that more improvements were necessary.

Similar accidents
Finland
 Jyväskylä rail accident – overspeed through turnout
Australia
 Waterfall rail accident – overspeed through sharp curve
Germany
 Brühl train disaster – overspeed through turnout
United Kingdom
 Milton rail crash – overspeed through turnout
 Bourne End rail crash – overspeed through turnout
 Goswick rail crash – overspeed through turnout

See also
 Lists of rail accidents

References

Railway accidents in 1996
Railway accidents and incidents in Finland
Tuusula
1996 in Finland
Railway accidents involving fog
Derailments in Finland
Accidents and incidents involving VR Group
April 1996 events in Europe
1996 disasters in Finland